Robert Hjalmar Mellin (19 June 1854 – 5 April 1933) was a Finnish mathematician and function theorist.

Biography
Mellin studied at the University of Helsinki and later in Berlin under Karl Weierstrass. He is chiefly remembered as the developer of the integral transform known as the Mellin transform. He studied related gamma functions, hypergeometric functions, Dirichlet series and the Riemann ζ function. He was appointed professor at the Polytechnic Institute in Helsinki, which later became Helsinki University of Technology with Mellin as first rector.

Later in his career Mellin also became known for his critical opposition to the theory of relativity; he published several papers in which he argued against the theory from a chiefly philosophical standpoint. In his private life he was known as an outspoken fennoman: a proponent of adopting Finnish as the language of state and culture in the Grand Duchy of Finland, in preference to Swedish, which had predominantly been used hitherto.

See also
Mellin inversion theorem
Mellin–Barnes integral
Poisson–Mellin–Newton cycle

External links

Hjalmar Mellins obituary, written by Ernst Lindelöf

1854 births
1933 deaths
People from Liminka
20th-century Finnish mathematicians
Relativity critics
Academic staff of the Helsinki University of Technology
19th-century Finnish mathematicians